Four by Pat is an EP by Pat Boone, released in 1957 on Dot Records.

It contained four songs: "Technique", "Cathedral in the Pines", "Louella", and "Without My Love".

In October–November 1957, the EP spent several weeks at number 2 of the Billboards Best Selling Pop EP's chart, only prevented from topping the chart by Elvis Presley's Loving You.

It also charted on Billboards Best Played by Jockeys chart and in September, before the addition of a separate EPs chart, it had charted at least as high as number 12 on the combined Best Selling Pop Albums chart.

Track listing

Charts

Year-end charts

Notes 
1.  Published from October 7, 1957

References 

Pat Boone albums
Dot Records EPs